Rowlatt is a surname. Notable people with the surname include:

Edmund Rowlatt (1633–1693), British Anglican priest
John Rowlatt (1898–1956), British lawyer
Justin Rowlatt (born 1966), British journalist and television presenter
Kathy Rowlatt (born 1948), British diver
Sidney Rowlatt (1862–1945), English lawyer and judge
Rowlatt Act
Rowlatt Committee